The men's team soft tennis event was part of the soft tennis programme and took place on August 31 and September 1, at the JSC - Tennis Court. South Korea clinched the gold medal in this event after beat Japan team in the final.

Schedule
All times are Western Indonesia Time (UTC+07:00)

Results

Preliminary round

Group A

Group B

Group C

Knockout round

Quarterfinals

Semifinals

Final

References

External links 
Official website
soft-tennis.org

Soft tennis at the 2018 Asian Games